The 1990 Los Angeles Dodgers season was the 101st for the franchise in Major League Baseball, and their 33rd season in Los Angeles, California.

The Dodgers finished in second place to the Cincinnati Reds in the 1990 National League Western Division race, as the team's pitching staff led the majors with 29 complete games. Ramón Martínez became the youngest Dodger starter to win 20 games since Ralph Branca, and also tied Sandy Koufax's club record with 18 strikeouts against the Atlanta Braves on June 4. On June 29, Fernando Valenzuela managed to throw a no-hitter against the St. Louis Cardinals, on the same night that Dave Stewart of the Oakland Athletics no-hit the Toronto Blue Jays.

Offseason
November 9, 1989: Acquired Jeff Bittiger from the Chicago White Sox for Tracy Woodson
December 20, 1989: Acquired Juan Samuel from the New York Mets for Mike Marshall and Alejandro Peña
April 1, 1990: Acquired Terry Wells from the Houston Astros for Franklin Stubbs

Regular season

Season standings

Record vs. opponents

Opening day lineup

Roster

Notable Transactions

May 13, 1990: Acquired Stan Javier from the Oakland Athletics for Willie Randolph.
June 2, 1990: John Shelby was released by the Dodgers.
September 13, 1990: Acquired Dennis Cook from the Philadelphia Phillies for Darrin Fletcher.
October 1, 1990: Acquired Mike Wilkins from the Detroit Tigers for Mike Munoz.

Player stats

Batting

Starters by position
Note: Pos = Position; G = Games played; AB = At bats; H = Hits; Avg. = Batting average; HR = Home runs; RBI = Runs batted in

Other batters
Note: G = Games played; AB = At bats; H = Hits; Avg. = Batting average; HR = Home runs; RBI = Runs batted in

Pitching

Starting pitchers
Note; G = Games pitched; IP = Innings pitched, W = Wins; L = Losses; ERA = Earned run average; SO = Strikeouts

Other pitchers
Note; G = Games pitched, IP = Innings pitched: W = Wins; L = Losses; ERA = Earned run average; SO = Strikeouts

Relief pitchers
Note: G = Games pitched; W = Wins; L = Losses; SV = Saves; ERA = Earned run average; SO = Strikeouts

1990 Awards
1990 Major League Baseball All-Star Game
Mike Scioscia starter
Ramón Martínez reserve
Silver Slugger Award
Eddie Murray
TSN National League All-Star
Mike Scioscia
Eddie Murray
NL Pitcher of the Month
Ramón Martínez (June 1990)
NL Player of the Month
Kal Daniels (September 1990)
NL Player of the Week
Fernando Valenzuela (June 25 – July 1)

Farm system 

Teams in BOLD won League Championships

Major League Baseball Draft

The Dodgers drafted 63 players in this draft. Of those, seven of them would eventually play Major League baseball. The Dodgers lost their second round pick to the Montreal Expos because they had signed free agent Hubie Brooks but they gained two supplemental second round picks as compensation for losing Dave Anderson and John Tudor. They also lost their third round pick to the Pittsburgh Pirates because they had signed pitcher Jim Gott.

The first round pick was left-handed pitcher Ronnie Walden out of Blanchard High School in Blanchard, Oklahoma. Serious arm injuries derailed his career and he only pitched in seven games in the Dodgers farm system, three in 1990 and four in 1993 when he attempted a comeback. He retired for good in 1994 with his arm so bad he would never be able to even play catch with his kids.

This years draft class was a disappointment as neither second round pick got out of "A" ball. Mike Busch, the fourth round pick, made the Majors, appearing in 51 games in 1995 and 1996 as a third baseman for the Dodgers but his decision to be a replacement player during the 1994–95 strike made it hard for him to catch on. He played in Korea and later played and managed in the independent Northern League. Busch was the only one of the Dodgers first 13 draft picks to advance past class A. Pitcher Todd Williams, who was selected in the 54th round, was the only Major Leaguer that signed from this draft class to have a length career as he had a 12-14 record in 227 games over parts of eight seasons.

References

External links 
1990 Los Angeles Dodgers uniform
Los Angeles Dodgers official web site
Baseball-Reference season page
Baseball Almanac season page

Los Angeles Dodgers seasons
Los Angeles Dodgers
Los Angeles Dodgers